Micaela Imperatori (born 28 April 1972 in Rome) is a retired Italian rhythmic gymnast.

She competed for Italy in the rhythmic gymnastics all-around competition at the 1988 Summer Olympics in Seoul, tying for 12th place overall.

References

External links 
 

1972 births
Living people
Italian rhythmic gymnasts
Gymnasts at the 1988 Summer Olympics
Olympic gymnasts of Italy
Gymnasts from Rome